Dalek I Love You may refer to:

 Dalek I Love You, music group
 Dalek I Love You (album), the group's self-titled album
 Dalek I Love You (radio), BBC Radio audio play